Nodocion is a genus of ground spiders that was first described by R. V. Chamberlin in 1922.

Species
 it contains eight species:
Nodocion eclecticus Chamberlin, 1924 – North America
Nodocion floridanus (Banks, 1896) – USA, Mexico
Nodocion mateonus Chamberlin, 1922 (type) – USA
Nodocion rufithoracicus Worley, 1928 – USA, Canada
Nodocion solanensis Tikader & Gajbe, 1977 – India
Nodocion tikaderi (Gajbe, 1993) – India
Nodocion utus (Chamberlin, 1936) – USA, Mexico
Nodocion voluntarius (Chamberlin, 1919) – North America

References

Araneomorphae genera
Gnaphosidae
Spiders of the Indian subcontinent
Spiders of North America